Cobalt germanide (CoGe) is an intermetallic compound, a germanide of cobalt. 

Cubic CoGe crystals (space group P213, cP8, a = 0.4631 nm) can be produced by processing a mixture of Co and Ge powders at a pressure of 4 GPa and a temperature of 800–1000 °C for 1–3 hours. They have no inversion center, and are therefore helical, with right-hand and left-handed chiralities. The cubic CoGe is metastable, and converts into a monoclinic phase upon subsequent heating to 600 °C at ambient pressure. 

Cubic CoGe is an antiferromagnet with a transition temperature Tc of 132 K.

References

Cobalt compounds
Germanides
Iron monosilicide structure type